La Source is the French to mean The Source. It may also refer to:

la Source or des Sources or les Sources, or variation, may refer to:

Places
 La Source, Haiti, a village in the Grand'Anse department of Haiti
 La Source, Arniquet, Haiti, a village in the Sud department of Haiti
 Les Sources, Estrie, Quebec, Canada; a regional county municipality
 Des Sources station, Montreal, Quebec, Canada; a light rail station
 Boulevard Des Sources, Montreal, Quebec, Canada; a large street

Arts and entertainment
The Source (Ingres), a painting by Ingres
The Source (2011 film), a 2011 French drama-comedy
Le Printemps (La Source), a painting by Pierre-Auguste Renoir

Ballet 
La source (Saint-Léon), an 1866 ballet with music by Léo Delibes and Ludwig Minkus
La source (Balanchine), a 1986 ballet by George Balanchine to music of Delibes

Music 
La Source (album), a 2007 album by Nâdiya
"La source" (song), a 1968 Eurovision song
La Source, a musical piece for harp by Alphonse Hasselmans
Les sources (album), a 2018 album by Vanessa Paradis

Other  
The Source (retailer), a Canadian electronics retailer
École élémentaire La Source, elementary school in Barrie, Ontario
La Source, the name of the first turn (a hairpin) at the motorsport racetrack Circuit de Spa-Francorchamps 
Stade de la Source, Orleans, France; a soccer stadium

See also

 Source (disambiguation)